Evarcha jucunda is a species of jumping spider.

It occurs naturally in the Mediterranean region, but was introduced to Belgium. It is also sometimes found in German greenhouses. Typically, it shows a large white or yellowish band surrounding the head region and a smaller one at the anterior end of abdomen. Males are black with a white line around their head and the top of their abdomen, which is brown.

Name
The species name is derived from Latin jucundus "pleasant".

References

External links

Picture of a female E. jucunda
Page of E. jucunda from Portugal with photos and information

Salticidae
Spiders of Europe
Spiders described in 1846